Shantou, alternately romanized as Swatow and sometimes known as Santow, is a prefecture-level city on the eastern coast of Guangdong, China, with a total population of 5,502,031 as of the 2020 census (5,391,028 in 2010) and an administrative area of . However, its built-up (or metro) area is much bigger with 12,543,024 inhabitants including Rongcheng and Jiedong districts, Jiexi county and Puning city in Jieyang plus all of Chaozhou city largely conurbated. This is de facto the 5th built-up area in mainland China between Hangzhou-Shaoxing (13,035,026 inhabitants), Xian-Xianyang (12,283,922 inhabitants) and Tianjin (11,165,706 inhabitants).

Shantou, a city significant in 19th-century Chinese history as one of the treaty ports established for Western trade and contact, was one of the original special economic zones of China established in the 1980s, but did not blossom in the manner that cities such as Shenzhen, Xiamen and Zhuhai did. However, it remains eastern Guangdong's economic centre, and is home to Shantou University, which is under the provincial Project 211 program in Guangdong.

History
Shantou was a fishing village part of Tuojiang Du, Jieyang County during the Song dynasty. It came to be known as Xialing during the Yuan dynasty. In 1563, Shantou became a part of Chenghai County in Chao Prefecture (Chaozhou). As early as 1574, Shantou had been called Shashanping. In the seventeenth century, a cannon platform called Shashantou Cannon was made here, and the place name later was shortened to "Shantou". Locally it has been referred to as Kialat.

Connecting to Shantou across the Queshi Bridge is Queshi which had been known by the local people through the 19th century as Kakchio. It was the main site for the American and British consulates. Today the area is a scenic park but some of the structures from its earlier history are somewhat preserved. In 1860, Shantou was opened for foreigners and became a trading port according to Treaty of Tientsin.

It became a city in 1919, and was separated from Chenghai in 1921. 1922 saw the devastating Swatow Typhoon, which killed 5,000 out of the 65,000 people then inhabiting the city. Some nearby villages were totally destroyed. Several ships near the coast were totally wrecked. Other ones were blown as far as two miles inland. The area around the city had around another 50,000 casualties. The total death toll was above 60,000, and may have been higher than 100,000.

In the 1930s, as a transport hub and a merchandise distribution centre in Southeast China, Shantou Port's cargo throughput ranked third in the country. A brief account of a visit to the city in English during this period is the English accountant Max Relton's A Man in the East: A Journey through French Indo-China (Michael Joseph Ltd., London, 1939). On 21 June 1939, Japanese troops invaded Shantou. Japanese forces occupied Shantou until 15 August 1945. The Communist People's Liberation Army captured Shantou on 24 October 1949, 23 days after the People's Republic of China was founded.

With higher-level administrative authority, Shantou governed Chaozhou City and Jieyang City from 1983 to 1989.

Geography
The city is located at the mouths of the Han, Rong, and Lian Rivers.

Climate
Shantou has a monsoon-influenced humid subtropical climate (Köppen Cwa), with short, mild to warm winters, and long, hot, humid summers. Winter begins sunny and dry but becomes progressively wetter and cloudier. Autumn is sunny and dry. With monthly percent possible sunshine ranging from 28% in March to 58% in July and October, the city receives 1,979 hours of bright sunshine annually.

Administration
Shantou is a prefecture-level city. It has direct jurisdiction over six districts and one county.

As of 2003, the district of Haojiang was established out of Hepu and Dahao which had been merged, and the district of Jinping Shengping and Jinyuan; Waisha and Xinxi Town, part of former Chenghai City, was merged into Longhu District; Chenghai City became Chenghai District; Chaoyang City was divided and became Chaoyang and Chaonan District respectively.

Economy

Shantou's economy is medium by Guangdong standards. Manufacturing accounts for a large and increasing share of employment. Canning, garments, lithography, plastic, and toys are some of the principal products. Toy manufacturing is the city's leading export industry, with 400 million U.S. dollars worth of exports each year. Canaton Calculator Co. is a multinational electronic devices manufacturing company.

Guiyu, a populous town in Chaoyang District, is the biggest electronic waste site on earth. Health-environmental issues incurred have concerned international organizations such as Greenpeace.

In 2000, the biggest tax fraud in the history of the People's Republic of China was uncovered, estimated worthy of 32.3 billion yuan. In 2017, the analyzed data of Shantou GDP is approximately 230 billion yuan(US$35.4 billion).

Development zone
It was ratified by the State Council of the People's Republic of China and founded in January 1993, and it formally came into use on December of the same year after its supervision installations were checked and accepted by the General Administration of Customs. It has been comprehensively developing export processing, storage, international trade, finance and information industry. Its goal is to establish a modernized international zone that is open to overseas by drawing experience from international free trade zones.

Demographics

Shantou is one of the most densely populated regions in China. Former Chaoyang City was China's most populous county-level administrative region, with 2.4 million inhabitants.
Shantou has direct jurisdiction over six districts and one county, and the six urban districts of Shantou have a population of 5,330,764.

Metro area
Nevertheless, its built-up area spread on 11 districts, Puning city and Raoping county was home to 12,543,024 inhabitants as of 2020 census.
This is de facto the fifth built-up area of China after Guangzhou-Shenzhen Pearl River Delta megacity, Shanghai-Suzhou-Wuxi-Changzhou conurbation, Beijing and Hangzhou-Shaoxing agglomeration.

Languages
Most residents are linguistically Chaoshan Min. Chaoshan dialect is a variant of Min Nan (Hokkien-Taiwanese) spoken in the neighbouring Southern Fujian and Taiwan. There are also Hakka, popularly known as Half-Hakka, living mainly in Chaoyang District and Chaonan District, although they speak Chaoshan on a daily basis and practise Chaoshan culture. The Mandarin-medium education system, widely promoted throughout China, has made most people, especially younger generations, speak Mandarin fluently. Cantonese language TV and labor migrations to the Pearl River Delta has also made Cantonese widely spoken as a third language by the younger generations.

Governmental statistics show that 2.16 million overseas Chinese have roots in Shantou, with significant populations of Teochew people residing in Thailand and Cambodia, which constitute a majority of Thai Chinese and a majority of Chinese Cambodians. This is demonstrated by the unusually high number of international direct flights between Bangkok and Shantou. In addition, there are at least two Teochew-speaking air hostesses on board each China Southern flight between Shantou and Bangkok. The Teochew presence, furthermore, is evident in Singapore and Malaysia; Johor Bahru, a coastal city situated at the latter's southernmost tip, is known as 'Little Swatow', due to the majority local Chinese populace is dominantly Teochew and as well as the second largest group of the local Chinese population in Singapore.

Culture and lifestyle

Shantou people share the same culture with other Teochew. The tea-drinking tradition widely practised in town is a classic instance. According to China Daily, Shantou people "drink more tea than anyone else in China, in total 700 million yuan (US$87.5 million) each year".

Religions

Most of the population in Shantou is non-religious or practices traditional folk religions, Buddhism, Taoism, or worship of Chinese deities and ancestors. About 2% of the population belongs to an organised religion, with 40,000 Protestants, 20,000 Catholics and 500 Muslims. St. Joseph's Cathedral of Shantou is the cathedral of the Roman Catholic Diocese of Shantou.

Infrastructure

Health
The public hospitals in the Shantou metropolitan area are operated by the Government of Shantou. Management of these hospitals and other specialist health facilities are coordinated by Shantou Board of Health.

Utilities
Shantou's electricity is provided entirely by China Southern Power Grid, postal service operated by China Post.

Telecommunications

Shantou is one of the most important international telecommunications ports in China. Four international submarine communications cables land at Shantou submarine cable landing station, including APCN 2, China-US Cable Network, SMW3 and South-East Asia Japan Cable System (SJC).

China Telecom, China Unicom and China Mobile provide fixed lines, broadband internet access and mobile telecommunications services there.

Transport

Urban transport
Public transportation is provided by bus, ferry, bike sharing system and taxi. Residents also travel by private car and motorbikes. There are two bridges throughout the city that cross the Shantou Harbor: the Queshi Bridge and Shantou Bay Bridge. A metro system is planned with construction of 3 lines (Lines 1, 2, and 3) commencing in 2018 and opening of the system planned in 2020.

Air
Shantou previously had its own civil airport, Shantou Waisha Airport. It was formerly the main airport serving the Shantou until nearby Jieyang Chaoshan Airport was opened on 15 December 2011. Shantou Waisha Airport became a military airbase since then and all civilian flights were transferred to the newly built airport in Jieyang. Taxi is the usual way to travel between the airport and the city proper. The taxi fare is around 60 RMB. Airport-Downtown Shantou shuttle charter is also suggested. Based in Shantou, Shantou Airlines Co. operated by China Southern Airlines has a 15 aircraft fleet in service.

Railways

There are 3 railway stations which serve Shantou: Chaoshan Railway Station and Chaoyang railway station which lie on the Xiamen-Shenzhen Railway line, and Shantou Railway Station which lies on the Guangzhou–Meizhou–Shantou Railway and is under construction for the Guangzhou-Shanwei-Shantou 350 km/h high speed railway.

Tourism attractions
 Shantou Times Square light show (19:00-21:00 on Friday and weekend)
 Shipaotai Park
 Chen Cihong's Former Residence
 Nan'ao Island, rated as Guangdong's most beautiful island by China's National Geographic magazine
 Palace-Temple of Old Mother: dedicated to Mazu, Goddess of Sea
 Temple of Emperor Guan: dedicated to Lord Guan
 Tropic of Cancer Symbol Tower: The Tropic of Cancer slips through Centipede Mountain, which is 20 kilometers away from the city properly.
 Shantou Museum: An art museum.
 Shantou Founding Museum: This history museum is devoted to the establishment of Swatow (Shantou) as a treaty port in the 19th century, not to be confused with Shantou Museum.
 Old town of Swatow and Dr. Sun Yat-sen memorial pavilion
 East Coast Avenue

The Shantou Cultural Revolution Museum was the country's only museum dedicated to the Cultural Revolution. It closed in 2016.

Media

In 1912 Swatow had four newspapers, all in Chinese. They were Han Chao Pao, Ming Chuan (People's Rights), Ta Fung Pao (The Typhoon), and Ta Tung Pao (Eastern Times). In 2018, Shantou Metropolis Daily Post and Shantou Special Economic Zone Evening News both stopped their traditional newspaper business and transform into e-newspaper newspapers. Meanwhile, the Shantou Daily (Municipal) keep providing both newspaper service and e-newspaper service for Shantou citizens and other readers.

Education
Education is overseen provincewide by the Guangdong Education Bureau.

Primary and secondary
Shantou has a host of well-known schools:
 Shantou Jinshan Middle School
 Shantou Number One Middle School
 Shantou Experimental School

Colleges and universities

 Shantou University (STU)
 Guangdong Technion-Israel Institute of Technology (GTIIT)
 South China University of Technology Shantou College
 Shantou Polytechnic
 Shantou Radio and TV University

Sports
 Haibin Stadium (Jinping District)
 Zhengda Stadium (Longhu District)
 Shantou Natatorium and Diving Stadium  (Haojiang District)
 Youngsters Soccer Court of Shantou Times Square  (Downtown)
 Fitness square and tennis courts of Xinghu Park  (Longhu District)
 Shantou Citic Golf Club(27Holes) (Haojiang District)
 Shantou Jinfeng Sports Park(Including golf course, basketball fields and soccer courts)(Longhu District)

Twin towns – sister cities
Shantou is twinned with:
 Cần Thơ, Vietnam (2005)
 Haifa, Israel (2015)
 Kishiwada, Japan (1990)
 Saint John, Canada (1997)

Friendly cities
Shantou has friendly relations with:

 Bangkok, Thailand (2000)
 Durrës, Albania (2015)
 Fairfield, Australia (2005)
 Federal Way, United States (2013)
 Johor Bahru, Malaysia (2011)
 Khabarovsk, Russia (2019)
 Leiria, Portugal (2018)
 Libreville, Gabon (2015)
 Puntarenas, Costa Rica (2014)
 Pyeongtaek, South Korea (2003)

Notable people
Many notable Chinese come from Shantou or their ancestral home is Shantou.

Entrepreneurs
Mainland China
Huang Guangyu (1969–), Chairman of Gome Group and once the richest persons in Mainland China
Ma Huateng (1971–), Founder of Tencent Computer System Co., Ltd and creator of QQ
Ji Haipeng, Chairman and Chief Executive Officer of Logan Property Holdings Co, Ltd.
Yao Zhenhua, the chairman of Baoneng Group, China's fourth-richest man as of January 2017
Thailand
Low Kiok Chiang (1843–1911), founder of Khiam Hoa Heng entreprises (1872-1950s)
Dhanin Chearavanont (1939-), Senior Chairman of CP Group, Thailand's largest private company and Forbes ranked.
Hong Kong
Sir Li Ka-shing GBM KBE JP (1928–; Chaozhou), tycoon, the chairman of the board for CK Hutchison Holdings.
Lim Por-yen (1914–2005), media tycoon, banker and charitarian
Singapore
 Tang Choon Keng (1901–2000), founder of Tangs

Entertainment
Hong Kong born
Emil Chau (1960–) actor and singer
Kwong Wah (1962–), actor and singer
Canti Lau (1964–) actor and singer
Sammi Cheng (1972–) actress and singer
Kent Cheng(1951-),actor
Mainland China
Cai Chusheng (1906–1968), director, and his film Song of the Fisherman received the first international film prize in China's history

Other
King Taksin (Zheng Xin) (1734–1782), Thailand King from 1767 to 1782
 Nuon Chea (1926–), Cambodian politician 
 Wu Nansheng (1922-), former Secretary of Guangdong Provincial Party Committee 
 Adele M. Fielde (1839–1916), missionary and author
 Qin Mu (1919–1992), writer
 Watchman Nee (1903–1972), theologian, and opponent of prosperity theology
 Tan Howe Liang (1933–), Singaporean weightlifting Olympian
 Chua Soi Lek (1947–), Malaysian politician and former President of MCA
 Xu Shilin (1998–), Chinese tennis player, Junior Olympic gold medallist
 Shing-Tung Yau (1949–), American mathematician, winner of the 1982 Fields Medal, the William Caspar Graustein Professor of Mathematics at Harvard University
 Hao Huang , Chinese mathematician, solver of Sensitivity Conjecture and Assistant Professor at Emory University

See also

Chaoshan
Chaozhou
Teochew people

References

Sources
 Miscellaneous series, Issues 7–11. United States Department of Commerce, Bureau of Foreign and Domestic Commerce, 1912.

Further reading
(Harvard University)

External links

  Official government website
 Website of Shantou Government
 Shantou Daily
 Guangdong Statistical Yearbook
 HISTORICAL PHOTOGRAPHS OF CHINA by UNIVERSITY OF BRISTOL

 
Prefecture-level divisions of Guangdong